Elizabeth Powell Bond (January 25, 1841 – March 29, 1926) was an educator and social activist who was the first Dean of Women at Swarthmore College.

Family and education
Elizabeth Powell was born in 1841 in Clinton, New York, to a Quaker couple, Catherine Macy Powell and Townsend Powell. Her father was a farmer, and when she was four, the family moved to a farm in Ghent. By the age of 15, she was serving as an assistant teacher at a Friends’ School in the county. She graduated at the age of seventeen from the State Normal School in Albany.

Like many Quakers, she held strong views against slavery and was a suffragist, peace activist, and temperance reformer. At the age of 16, she was speaking out at local meetings of anti-slavery campaigners. She spent some time in the household of the abolitionist William Lloyd Garrison before her marriage.

In 1872, she married Henry Herrick Bond, a lawyer from Northampton, Massachusetts. They had two sons, Edwin (born 1874), and Herrick, (born 1878, died in infancy). Henry Herrick Bond died in 1881.

Career in education
Bond began her career by teaching for two years in New York public schools. In the early 1860s, she ran a boarding school for three years out of her parents’ house, with the student body including both African-American and Catholic children.

In 1865, after training with the physical culture advocate Diocletian Lewis, Bond became the first  instructor in gymnastics at Vassar College. In the early 1870s, she briefly headed up the Free Congregational Sunday school in Florence, Massachusetts, returning in 1885 to become the resident minister for a year. She also worked for a time as editor (with her husband) of the Northampton Journal.

In 1886, Swarthmore College appointed Elizabeth Powell Bond to the post of Matron of the College. In 1890, she was named Dean, a position she kept until her retirement in 1906, when she was named Dean Emeritus. She was succeeded by Henrietta Meeteer as Dean. She played an important role in the development of coeducation at the college.

Bond died in Germantown, Pennsylvania, in 1926.

Legacy
An avid gardener, Bond was honored by Swarthmore with a rose garden created in her honor. A room at the college also bears her name.

Her papers, including correspondence, diaries, business papers, pictures, and memorabilia, are held by Swarthmore College. Her correspondents included Louisa May Alcott, Hannah Clothier Hull, William Lloyd Garrison, and many others.

References

Further reading
Johnson, Emily C. Dean Bond of Swarthmore: A Quaker Humanist. Philadelphia: J. B. Lippincott Company, 1926.

1841 births
1926 deaths
Swarthmore College people
Vassar College people
People from Dutchess County, New York
Educators from New York (state)
American women educators
Wikipedia articles incorporating text from A Woman of the Century
American feminists
Quaker feminists
Quaker abolitionists
American Quakers